Stornes Peninsula is a rocky, jagged peninsula about 3 nautical miles (6 km) long, projecting into Prydz Bay just west of Larsemann Hills. First mapped by Norwegian cartographers from air photos taken by the Lars Christensen Expedition, 1936–37, and named Stornes (big promontory, or ness).

See also
Blundell Peak

Peninsulas of Antarctica
Landforms of Princess Elizabeth Land
Ingrid Christensen Coast